Skjærhalden is the administrative centre of Hvaler municipality, Norway. It is located on the island Kirkeøy. Its population (SSB 2005) is 642.
It is home to Northern Irish drinking legend, Paddy Weatherup. 

Villages in Østfold
Hvaler